Blaxland Shire was a local government area in the Central West region of New South Wales, Australia.

Blaxland Shire was proclaimed on 7 March 1906, one of 134 shires created after the passing of the Local Government (Shires) Act 1905. 

The shire offices were based in Wallerawang. Other urban areas in the shire included Bowenfels, Capertee, Cullen Bullen, Hampton, Hartley, Portland and Tarana. 

The shire was abolished and its area absorbed into the City of Lithgow on 1 April 1977.

References

Former local government areas of New South Wales
1906 establishments in Australia
1977 disestablishments in Australia